Hyperaspis lateralis, the lateral lady beetle, is a species of lady beetle in the family Coccinellidae. It is found in Central America and North America.

Subspecies
These two subspecies belong to the species Hyperaspis lateralis:
 Hyperaspis lateralis lateralis
 Hyperaspis lateralis nigrocauda Dobzhansky

References

Further reading

 

Coccinellidae
Articles created by Qbugbot
Beetles described in 1850
Beetles of Central America
Beetles of North America